Zimmerman House, also known as Zim House, is a historical structure located in Horseheads, New York. It was the home of cartoonist Eugene Zimmerman, also known as "Zim". The architectural and historic significance of the house led to its listing in the National Register of Historic Places in 1983.

Zimmerman designed the house in 1890 in a Queen Anne style. It was built by his father-in-law, Alvah Beard. Zimmerman also designed the Zim Bandstand in nearby Teal Park. Both are in Horseheads's1855 Extension Historic District.

The house is open for tour by appointment with the Horseheads Historical Society and features some of Zimmerman's works on display.

Gallery

References

External links
 website - Horseheads Historical Society

Houses on the National Register of Historic Places in New York (state)
Houses in Chemung County, New York
Museums in Chemung County, New York
Historic house museums in New York (state)
Literary museums in the United States
Biographical museums in New York (state)
National Register of Historic Places in Chemung County, New York